Gisela Dulko and Flavia Pennetta were the defending champions, but they lost to Alexandra Dulgheru and Jarmila Gajdošová in the quarterfinals.
Chinese pair Peng Shuai and Zheng Jie won the title beating No. 3 seeds Vania King and Yaroslava Shvedova in the final 6–2, 6–3. Peng Shuai had won the title earlier in 2010 Internazionali BNL d'Italia – Women's doubles

Seeds
The top four seeds received a bye into the second round.

Draw

Finals

Top half

Bottom half

References
Main Draw

Italian Open - Doubles
Women's Doubles